Rete 4  (in English Network 4) is an Italian free-to-air television channel operated by Mediaset Italia and owned by MFE - MediaForEurope. Presently the director is Sebastiano Lombardi.

Programs

TV Programmes (currently) 
Rete 4's strength is information: a lot of programs are of this genre.

 Quarta Repubblica (Political and chronical news), on Monday's prime-time with Nicola Porro.
 Fuori dal coro (Political and chronical news), on Tuesday's prime-time with Mario Giordano.
 Zona bianca (Political and chronical news), on Wednesday's prime-time Giuseppe Brindisi.
 Dritto e rovescio (Political and chronical news), on Thursday's prime-time with Paolo Del Debbio.
 Quarto grado (Crime news), on Friday's prime-time with Gianluigi Nuzzi and Alessandra Viero.
 Stasera Italia (Political news). Every day at 8.30 PM, with Barbara Palombelli (Monday-Friday) and Veronica Gentili (Weekends and summer)
 Lo sportello di Forum (Culture and judicial), enlivened by Barbara Palombelli, from Monday to Friday at 14.00 (Saturday there is a replica)
 Dalla parte degli animali, Monday at 3.30 PM, with Michela Vittoria Brambilla. Are told real stories about adopted animals. In every episode there are presented animals in search of family.
 TG4 (newscast)
 TgCom24 (short one-minute news during the commercial break in a movie)

TV series 
24 (first four seasons - afterward, the series was relocated to Italia 1)
Agatha Christie's Poirot
A Nero Wolfe Mystery
The A-Team
Bones
Casa Vianello
Columbo
Distretto di Polizia
Degrassi: The Next Generation (it: Degrassi: La Generazione Seguente)
Detective Monk
Diagnosis: Murder
Downton Abbey
Early Edition
Hunter
Kojak
Judging Amy
Magnum, P.I.
Miami Vice
Murder, she wrote (Previously aired on Rai 1 and Rai 2)
Nash Bridges
Notruf Hafenkante
Quincy, M.E.
R.I.S. – Delitti imperfetti
Renegade
Robotech
Siska
The Mentalist
The West Wing
T. J. Hooker
Walker, Texas Ranger

Culture
Appuntamento con la Storia (ENG: "Date with History")
La macchina del tempo (ENG: "The Time Machine")
La settima porta (ENG: "The seventh door")
Sai xChè? (ENG: "Do you know why?")
Solaris

Soap operas
Guiding Light (it: "Sentieri")
Storm of Love (it: "Tempesta D'Amore")
The Young and the Restless (it: "Febbre d'Amore")

TelenovelasCuore Selvaggio ("Corazón salvaje")
El secreto de Puente Viejo (it: "Il Segreto", replicas)
Acacias 38 (it: "Una Vita")Terra Nostra''
The programming is completed with various genres of films.

Logos

Audience

Share 24h* Rete 4 
Below, average monthly listening data in the total day received by the issuer.

References

External links
 Official site 
 COURT OF JUSTICE OF THE EUROPEAN COMMUNITIES

Mediaset television channels
Television channels and stations established in 1982
Italian-language television stations